Paracantha genalis is a species of tephritid or fruit flies in the genus Paracantha of the family Tephritidae.

Distribution
Canada, Mexico, United States.

References

Tephritinae
Insects described in 1941
Diptera of North America